Rebecca P. Edwards is an American politician and therapist who served as a member of the Utah House of Representatives from 2009 to 2018. On May 27, 2021, Edwards announced her candidacy in the 2022 United States Senate election in Utah.

Early life
Edwards earned her Bachelor of Science, Master of Social Work with a focus on marriage and family therapy, and Master of Science degrees from Brigham Young University.

Career 
Edwards began her career as a marriage and family therapist before becoming a homemaker.

Utah House of Representatives

In 2008, Edwards challenged District 20 incumbent Republican Representative Paul Neuenschwander in the June 24, 2008 Republican primary and won with 1,413 votes (52.1%) and won the three-way November 4, 2008 general election with 8,866 votes (65.9%) against Democratic nominee Kyle Roberts and Constitution candidate Robert Moultrie, who had run for the seat in 2006.

In 2010, Edwards had two challengers and was selected by the Republican convention as one of two candidates for the June 22, 2010 Republican primary, which she won with 2,043 votes (58%) and won the three-way November 2, 2010 general election with 6,531 votes against Democratic nominee William Ward and returning 2008 Constitution candidate Robert Moultrie.

In 2012, Edwards was selected over a challenger by the Republican convention and won the November 6, 2012 general election with 10,807 votes (75.8%) against Democratic candidate Daniel Donahoe.
 
Edwards was unopposed at the Republican convention in the 2014 election cycle. She faced Democratic Party nominee Robert G. Moultrie and Constitution Party nominee Donna Taylor. Edwards won the general election with 5,257 votes (71%).

During the 2016 legislative session, Edwards served on the Public Education Appropriations Subcommittee, the House Economic Development and Workforce Services Committee as well as the House Public Utilities, Energy, and Technology Committee. During the 2016 session, as Medicaid expansion was being debated, Edwards characterized the expansion approved by lawmakers as "leaving women out of the equation." She also called for a general "change [to] the culture of politics" regarding women's participation in elected office.

In the 2018 session, Edwards was the primary sponsor of HCR 7, a resolution by which Utah officially "recognized the existence of a changing climate, factors that contribute to these changes, and the potential negative effects on the state of Utah." HCR 7 notes that Utah's economy or its "global competitiveness" should not be constrained by efforts to mitigate or prepare for the effects of climate change. With HCR 7, Utah became the only state with a Republican-led legislature to officially recognize climate change.

Edwards chose not to run for re-election to her seat in 2018.

Edwards maintained a public blog throughout her tenure in the Legislature. In it, she variously discussed upcoming bills, her work on committees, constituent interactions, and day-to-day business on the Hill. Every week during her ten legislative sessions, she invited constituents to her home for discussions.

Committee assignments

Sponsored legislation

(Per the original source, this list may not be comprehensive.)

2022 Senate race
Edwards was mentioned as a possible candidate for the 2022 United States Senate election in Utah. She would challenge Mike Lee in the Republican primary. On May 27, 2021, Edwards announced her candidacy for the US Senate.

In her announcement she positioned herself as more of a centrist option than Lee, who is known for being one of the most conservative lawmakers in the Senate, saying: "Utah is tired of the division and political bickering that have become a constant in Washington, D.C. It's time for action." On July 15, 2021, she announced she had raised $466,000 in her first quarter of fundraising, including a maximum allowable contribution from the head coach of the Kansas City Chiefs, Andy Reid.

She came in second place in the Republican Primary on June 28, 2022.

Personal life 
Edwards lives in North Salt Lake, Utah, with her husband John, son of former BYU football Coach LaVell Edwards. She serves as a board member on the Days of '47 committee and volunteers at Salt Lake City Head Start. She has nine grandchildren. Edwards and her husband served as humanitarian missionaries with the Church of Jesus Christ of Latter-day Saints in American Samoa.

References

External links
Official page at the Utah State Legislature
Campaign site
Becky Edwards at Ballotpedia
Becky Edwards at the National Institute on Money in State Politics

21st-century American politicians
21st-century American women politicians
Brigham Young University alumni
Candidates in the 2022 United States Senate elections
Latter Day Saints from Utah
Living people
Republican Party members of the Utah House of Representatives
People from North Salt Lake, Utah
Place of birth missing (living people)
Women state legislators in Utah
Year of birth missing (living people)